The Dog Trick (Swedish: Hundtricket – The Movie) is a 2002 Swedish romantic comedy film directed by Christian Eklöw and Christopher Panov. It stars Linus Wahlgren, Alexander Skarsgård and Josephine Bornebusch in the lead roles. Skarsgård received a Guldbagge Award nomination for Best Supporting Actor.

Cast
Linus Wahlgren as Simon
Josephine Bornebusch as Mia
Alexander Skarsgård as Robinson-Micke
Ivan Nikcevic as Mario
Kjell Bergqvist as Teacher

References

External links

2002 films
2000s Swedish-language films
2002 romantic comedy films
Swedish romantic comedy films
2000s Swedish films